Uğurlu is a village in the Sincik District of Adıyaman Province in Turkey. The village had a population of 129 in 2021.

The hamlets of Çal, Eliaçık, Eskisu, Işık, Kolbaşı, Tosunkaya and Ürünlü are attached to the village.

References 

Kurdish settlements in Adıyaman Province
Villages in Sincik District